The Airport of the Pacific is a planned joint-use civilian international airport and military base which will be located in Conchagua, El Salvador, and will serve the city of La Unión. The airport was proposed by Salvadoran President Nayib Bukele during his 2019 presidential campaign as a part of his "Plan Cuscatlán" and construction was approved by the Legislative Assembly on 26 April 2022. Construction is planned to begin in 2023.

Planning

Initial proposals 

In 2019, then Salvadoran presidential candidate Nayib Bukele published "Plan Cuscatlán," an outline of his objectives and goals for his term as president of El Salvador. Within "Plan Cuscatlán," he proposed the construction of a new airport in eastern El Salvador, then referred to it as the "Airport in the East". Bukele cited that many of the passengers who pass through El Salvador's Saint Óscar Arnulfo Romero y Galdámez International Airport in south-central El Salvador live in eastern El Salvador, and that a new airport in the east would simultaneously ease congestion of El Salvador's main international airport and bring jobs and an economic boost to the east of the country.

On 9 March 2020, the Salvadoran government began an international public offering, titled the "Pacific Airport Project," to foreign companies to study the design of the airport, with 44 companies in total showing interest in the project. Of the 44 companies, 11 presented their economic models to the Salvadoran government.

On 24 February 2022, the government was given an economic and financial report for the airport by Peyco-ALBEN 4000 Consortium, an air transportation company. The report estimated that the airport would create 4,700 new jobs in its first year of operation. The plan also estimated that within its first 10 years of operation, the airport would accommodate between 1 and 3 million passengers and around 18,000 aircraft movements. Federico Anliker, the president of the Autonomous Port Executive Commission (CEPA) also estimated that the airport's construction would create over 23,700 new jobs. In March 2022, CEPA confirmed that the airport would be located in Conchagua, a municipality of the La Unión department just south of the city of La Unión.

Government approval 

On 25 April 2022, the Legislative Assembly's Economic Commission approved a law which would authorize the construction of the airport. On 26 April 2022, the Legislative Assembly approved the law which the Economic Commission approved the day prior, officially authorizing the construction of the airport. The law, titled the "Law for the Construction, Administration, Operation, and Maintenance of the Airport of the Pacific," was passed with 67 of the 84 votes in favor.

Construction 

Construction of the Airport of the Pacific is expected to begin in 2023. The airport will be 126,530 square feet (11,755 square meters) in size and construction is estimated to cost $500 million US dollars over 10 years.

In October 2022, 10 of the 150 landowners affected by the airport's construction stated that they would not sell their land to the government. CEPA stated that they will seek to come to a settlement with the landowners, and Federico Anliker, the president of CEPA, accused them of being "manipulated" by the country's opposition political parties to oppose the airport's construction. In January 2023, Cristosal, a non-government organization, claimed that three laws regarding the airport's construction "open the door to corruption" and called upon the Supreme Court of Justice to block the laws.

See also 

 List of airports in El Salvador

References

External links 

 Official website 

Airports in El Salvador
La Unión Department
Proposed airports